405th may refer to:

405th Air Expeditionary Group, the flying component of the 405th Air Expeditionary Wing
405th Air Expeditionary Wing, provisional United States Air Force unit assigned to Air Combat Command
405th Tactical Missile Squadron ("Green Dragons"), an inactive United States Air Force unit

See also
405 (number)
405 (disambiguation)
405, the year 405 (CDV) of the Julian calendar
405 BC